Christmas & Chill is the second Christmas record and extended play (EP) by American singer Ariana Grande. It was released on December 18, 2015 by Republic Records as a follow-up to her 2013 Christmas EP Christmas Kisses and her 2014 Christmas single "Santa Tell Me". The EP features six, original, R&B-inspired Christmas tracks produced by American producers Tommy Brown, Mr. Franks, The Magi, and Travis Sayles. Grande has continuously expressed admiration and has referred to it as her "favorite body of work".

The EP received favorable reviews from music critics. It debuted at number 34 on the Billboard 200 albums chart and at number 3 on the Billboard Holiday Albums ranking in the United States. The EP sold 35,000 copies in its first week of release in the US and has sold over 180,000 copies worldwide. Christmas & Chill  was originally only available as a digital download, but on November 18, 2016, the EP was reissued on CD in Japan with a new artwork.  The EP gained renewed interest when it was reissued as vinyl LPs in November 2019, including "Santa Tell Me" as a hidden track.

Recording and music
According to Tommy Brown, the EP was recorded in four days at Ariana Grande's home studio, in Hollywood. Songwriting credits are shared by Grande with Brown. For Rolling Stones Brittany Spanos, the EP consists of "romantic Christmas ballads over trap beats", commenting that "the one song to stand out from the more R&B-leaning EP is the folky 'Winter Things', where the acoustic track resembles Jason Mraz, as Grande sings 'My baby's in town and we're gonna do some winter things'.".

Critical reception
Jaleesa M. Jones in USA Today called it "a festive ode to winter romance." Emma Garland from Noisey said the album "basically sounds like a Cassie album ... but with sleigh bells and lyrics like 'tis the season for some love giving!' It's basically the perfect festive romp." Two years after its release, MTV's  Sydney Gore and Brian Anthony Hernandez revisited the EP, calling it "a new holiday classic" and "a catalyst of original Christmas carols for the so-called doomed millennial generation. ...[T]his EP has the power to melt any trace of snow that's piling up on your front porch. ... There's a playful, eflish energy about ["True Love"] that makes you want to hang mistletoe everywhere to secure a smooch with that special someone."

Billboard ranked the EP as one of the Best Christmas Albums of the 21st Century "Grande’s second holiday EP eschews traditional sounds of the season, opting instead for contemporary R&B grooves, trap synths and punny innuendo [...] Despite some sleigh bells and a few tossed-off references to the North Pole, this isn’t your parents’ holiday fare."

Track listing

 denotes a remixer

Charts

References

2015 Christmas albums
2015 EPs
Albums produced by Tommy Brown (record producer)
Ariana Grande albums
Christmas albums by American artists
Christmas EPs
Contemporary R&B Christmas albums
Republic Records EPs
Trap music albums